Ernesto Escobedo was the defending champion but chose not to defend his title.

Michael Mmoh won the title after defeating John Millman 4–6, 7–6(7–3), 6–3 in the final.

Seeds

Draw

Finals

Top half

Bottom half

References
Main Draw
Qualifying Draw

Kentucky Bank Tennis Championships - Men's Singles
2017 Men's Singles